Charles Norris Poulson (July 23, 1895 – September 25, 1982) was an American politician who represented Southern California in public office at the local, state, and federal levels. He served as the 36th Mayor of Los Angeles, California from 1953 to 1961, after having been a California State Assemblyman and then a member of the United States Congress.  He was a Republican.

Early life and career
Charles Norris Poulson was born in Baker County, Oregon.  He was the son of Peter Skovo Poulson (1843-1928) who was an immigrant from Denmark. Poulson attended Oregon State University in Corvallis for two years before he wed Erna June Loennig on December 25, 1916.  The couple arrived in Los Angeles in 1923.  Poulson became a certified public accountant through correspondence classes and night school at Southwestern Law School, which at that time had a business school.

Political career

California State Assembly and U.S. Congress
In 1938, he was elected to the 56th District seat of the California State Assembly. He won a congressional seat four years later.  After losing the seat in the 1944 election, he returned to the United States Congress following the 1946 elections, remaining there until his election as mayor of Los Angeles. During his years as a congressman, Poulson helped lead California in its fight against Arizona over Colorado River water.  At the time of his departure from Congress, he was the chairman of the Committee on Interior and Insular Affairs.

Mayor of Los Angeles

Poulson's victory in the Los Angeles mayoral race came after a contentious battle in which his opponent, incumbent mayor Fletcher Bowron, claimed that the Los Angeles Times wanted to control city government and, by endorsing Poulson, would have a puppet in the mayor's office.  Poulson, for his part, challenged Bowron's support for public housing, in particular a project in the area known as Chavez Ravine in  Elysian Park Heights (a site on which Dodger Stadium would one day be built).  With the support of the group Citizens Against Socialist Housing (CASH) and drawing on the anti-communist atmosphere of the time, Poulson promised to end support for such "un-American" housing projects and to fire city employees who were communists or who refused to answer questions about their political activities.

During his eight years as mayor, Los Angeles became the third largest city in the United States, with Poulson instrumental in leading the construction of the Los Angeles International Airport and expanding the Los Angeles Harbor. Most notably, he led the drive to lure baseball's Brooklyn Dodgers to Los Angeles. This led to what became known as the Battle of Chavez Ravine which resulted in the removal of Hispanic residents from land on which Dodger Stadium was later constructed. He helped integrate the city's fire and police departments and initiated a garbage recycling program that proved to be a factor in his defeat in 1961.

In 1958 and 1959, Paulson served as president of the United States Conference of Mayors.

Perhaps the most memorable image of his mayoral career came on September 21, 1959, when he addressed Soviet premier Nikita Khrushchev during a public ceremony. The comments came after Khrushchev had constantly touted Soviet superiority during his tour of the city by Poulson. Citing Khrushchev's phrase, "We will bury you," Poulson responded, "You shall not bury us and we shall not bury you.  We tell you in the friendliest terms possible we are planning no funerals, yours or our own."  Poulson received over 3,600 letters following the incident, many of them praising him for his comments.

He lost a reelection campaign in 1961 to Sam Yorty, partly due to having to explain the expenses incurred by the Dodgers' franchise shift.  Efforts to blunt such criticism were limited due to a severe case of laryngitis, which prevented him from responding to the invitation from local television personality George Putnam to debate Yorty on his show.  Poulson never recovered from the laryngitis and his campaign never recovered from the setback.
  
Following the defeat, Poulson briefly returned to accounting before moving to La Jolla, California in 1962.  He died in 1982.

See also

 George P. Cronk, Poulson campaign manager in 1953

References

External links
 
Norris Poulson papers 
Join California Norris Poulson

Further reading

1895 births
1982 deaths
American people of Danish descent
Oregon State University alumni
Southwestern Law School alumni
Mayors of Los Angeles
People from Baker County, Oregon
Republican Party members of the United States House of Representatives from California
20th-century American politicians
Presidents of the United States Conference of Mayors
Old Right (United States)
Republican Party members of the California State Assembly